In geometry, an edge is a particular type of line segment joining two vertices in a polygon, polyhedron, or higher-dimensional polytope. In a polygon, an edge is a line segment on the boundary, and is often called a polygon side. In a polyhedron or more generally a polytope, an edge is a line segment where two faces (or polyhedron sides) meet. A segment joining two vertices while passing through the interior or exterior is not an edge but instead is called a diagonal.

Relation to edges in graphs
In graph theory, an edge is an abstract object connecting two graph vertices, unlike polygon and polyhedron edges which have a concrete geometric representation as a line segment.
However, any polyhedron can be represented by its skeleton or edge-skeleton, a graph whose vertices are the geometric vertices of the polyhedron and whose edges correspond to the geometric edges. Conversely, the graphs that are skeletons of three-dimensional polyhedra can be characterized by Steinitz's theorem as being exactly the 3-vertex-connected planar graphs.

Number of edges in a polyhedron

Any convex polyhedron's surface has Euler characteristic

where V is the number of vertices, E is the number of edges, and F is the number of faces. This equation is known as Euler's polyhedron formula. Thus the number of edges is 2 less than the sum of the numbers of vertices and faces. For example, a cube has 8 vertices and 6 faces, and hence 12 edges.

Incidences with other faces
In a polygon, two edges meet at each vertex; more generally, by Balinski's theorem, at least d edges meet at every vertex of a d-dimensional convex polytope.
Similarly, in a polyhedron, exactly two two-dimensional faces meet at every edge, while in higher dimensional polytopes three or more two-dimensional faces meet at every edge.

Alternative terminology
In the theory of high-dimensional convex polytopes, a facet or side of a d-dimensional polytope is one of its (d − 1)-dimensional features, a ridge is a (d − 2)-dimensional feature, and a peak is a (d − 3)-dimensional feature. Thus, the edges of a polygon are its facets, the edges of a 3-dimensional convex polyhedron are its ridges, and the edges of a 4-dimensional polytope are its peaks.

See also

Extended side

References

External links

Elementary geometry
Multi-dimensional geometry
1